Rattan Mohan Sharma (born 14 June 1971) is an Indian classical vocalist, belonging to the Mewati gharana. He performs classical music forms such as khyal and tarana as well as light classical forms such as Haveli Sangeet, Tappa and Bhajan as well as Rajasthani Folk. He is considered an "A" grade artist on All India Radio.

Early life and training
Sharma was born in Rajasthan to Padma and Mohan Lal Sharma. He is the nephew and a disciple of classical vocalist, PanditJasraj. His affinity for percussion instruments in his youth led Sharma to practice tabla up to the age of 15. Over the years, he has trained under Motiram, Maniram and Jasraj.

Career

He belongs to the Mewati Gharana and belongs to the family of vocalists such as Motiram, Maniram, Pratap Narayan, and Jasraj. He has performed in many concerts and festivals in India and abroad. As a playback singer he has performed in the mythological film Dashavatar (2009).

He performs regularly at the classical music festival Pandit Motiram Pandit Maniram Sangeet Samaroh organized by Jasraj.

Awards & Titles
 Shankar Rao Vyas Award
 Pandit Jasraj rotating Trophy
 Mewati Gharana Gaurav Puraskar
 Acharya Varishtha (title)
 Sur Ratna (title)
 Sur Mañi (title)
 IWAF (gharana award)
 Rajasthan gaurav samman
 Marwar ratna

Personal life
Sharma is married to Ekta Sharma and has a son, Swar Sharma.

Discography
Devotional albums include

 Mere Bhagwan - Shri Ramji
 Mere Bhagwan - Mere Guru
 Mere Bhagwan - Shri Hanumanji
 Mere Bhagwan - Shri Saibaba 
 Mere Bhagwan - Shri Ganeshji
 Mere Bhagwan - Shri Krishnaji
 Mere Bhagwan - Shri Vishnuji
 Mere Bhagwan - Gayatri Maa
 Mere Bhagwan - Durga Maa
 Jaago bhor bhayi
 Dashavatar
 Naman
 Gayatri
 Gayatri Aradhana
 Hanuman Raksha Kavach

 Navagraha Shakti
 Bhaktamar Stotra
 Navkar
 Dharohar (Hindustani Classical)
 Jasrangi (With Pta. Gargee Siddhant Dutta)
 Mewati Gharana
 Utsav (DVD with Shankar Mahadevan)
 Hanuman I
 Hanuman II
 Hanuman Dhun
 Shiv Dhun
 Healing Mantras - Heart
 Lalita Shahastra Naam
 Gayatri Shahastra Naam
 Jai Gangey
 Sapta vaar katha

 Healing Mantras- Respiration
 The Holy Trinity
 Nav Durga
 Satyanarayan Katha
 Surya
 Vaastu
 Temple Music of India (Haveli Sangeet)
 Gopal
 Krishna Leela
 Sama (Gujarati Garba, in praise of The Aga Khan)
 Maha Mrityunjay
 Sampoorna Maha Mrityunjay
 Shri Raam
 Raam Dhun
 Holi - The Great Radha Krishna Celebration
 Spiritual Mantras Vol 1
 Jago Matt Shubh Prabhat Aaya

References

External links
 

Hindustani singers
1971 births
Living people
People from Rajasthan
Mewati gharana
Performers of Hindu music
Indian male singers
Bhajan singers